General Stevens may refer to:

Clement H. Stevens (1821–1864), Confederate States Army brigadier general
Ebenezer Stevens (1751–1823), New York State Militia major general in the American Revolutionary War
Hestor L. Stevens (1803–1864), New York State Militia major general
Isaac Stevens (1818–1862), Union Army brigadier general posthumously promoted to major general
Jack Stevens (1896–1969), Australian Army major general
John Harvey Stevens (died 1866), Royal Marines major general
Joyce L. Stevens (fl. 1970s–2010s), U.S. Army major general
Walter H. Stevens (1827–1867), Confederate States Army brigadier general
William George Stevens (1893–1975), New Zealand Military Forces major general